The William Jasper Johnson House is a historic house at the junction of Lakeshore Road and Honeysuckle Avenue in Bull Shoals, Arkansas.  Located just north of the junction, it is a modest single-story frame structure, finished in drop siding and resting on stone piers.  Its form is that of a typical vernacular Ozark single pen, with a side gable roof and shed-roof porch across the front.  The house was built about 1900 by William Jasper Johnson, who had married the daughter of a prominent local landowner.  It is one of the few surviving reminders of the area's early settlement history.

The house was listed on the National Register of Historic Places in 2018.

See also
National Register of Historic Places listings in Marion County, Arkansas

References

Houses on the National Register of Historic Places in Arkansas
Houses completed in 1900
Houses in Marion County, Arkansas
National Register of Historic Places in Marion County, Arkansas
Single pen architecture
1900 establishments in Arkansas